The Miami FC is an American professional soccer team based in Miami, Florida that competes in the USL Championship, the second tier of the American soccer pyramid.

The club began play in the North American Soccer League (NASL) in the 2016 season. Following the demise of the NASL, the club participated in the National Premier Soccer League (NPSL) and the National Independent Soccer Association (NISA) before moving to the USL Championship for the 2020 season. The team currently plays its home games at Riccardo Silva Stadium on the campus of Florida International University.

History

North American Soccer League 
The club was announced on May 20, 2015, as the 12th North American Soccer League franchise with plans to begin play in the 2016 season and later confirmed it would play out of "Ocean First Stadiums" (Now Riccardo Silva Stadium) on the campus of FIU. The team, co-owned by media entrepreneur Riccardo Silva and former Italian national team defender Paolo Maldini, came only one year after former England national team star and Major League Soccer legend David Beckham announced his intent to launch an MLS team in city.

In September 2015, Alessandro Nesta was appointed as the club's first coach. On November 20, 2015, Italian sportswear company Macron were announced as the club's kit suppliers on a three-year deal.

Nesta resigned as coach following the completion of the 2017 season, on 17 November.

National Premier Soccer League and 'Miami FC 2'
In January 2018, following the suspension and later cancellation of the 2018 NASL season, the organization announced the creation of "The Miami FC 2" in the National Premier Soccer League with 12 members of its 2017 NASL roster. The intention was for Miami FC's players to play with Miami FC 2 while waiting for the NASL's proposed winter schedule to take effect. The team hired Paul Dalglish as the new head coach on January 25. The team played its home matches at its former training grounds on the campus of St. Thomas University in Miami Gardens.

The team went on to dominate the regular season in the NPSL's Sunshine Conference. Only one loss to Jacksonville Armada FC in the regular season led the team to finish top of the table and in the conference playoffs the beat the Armada, 3–1, to win its first NPSL trophy. After advancing in the national playoffs, including winning the NPSL South Region, Miami FC 2 won the organization's first ever league championship when it defeated FC Motown, 3–1, for the NPSL National Championship on August 4.

For the 2019 NPSL season, the team returned to playing as Miami FC and repeated its previous year's success by finishing atop the regular season table and winning the Sunshine Conference over Miami United FC, 3–2. It won the South Region for a second straight year before becoming the first club to win a second NPSL National Championship when it defeated the New York Cosmos B, 3–1, and earning the organization's eighth trophy in three years.

National Independent Soccer Association 
On November 15, 2018, the NPSL announced that Miami would be a founding member in a new professional league, commencing with the "NPSL Founders Cup" competition from August to November 2019, followed by a full league schedule in 2020 at either division 2 or 3 level. However, on July 24, 2019, it was announced that Miami would instead join the National Independent Soccer Association (NISA) for the inaugural Fall 2019 season. The team went undefeated through seven games during the regular season, clinching the top playoff spot in the East Coast Conference. On November 9, Miami won the NISA East Coast Championship over Stumptown Athletic, its ninth trophy in three years.

USL Championship 
On December 11, 2019, former USL Championship club Ottawa Fury FC announced that it had sold its franchise rights to the Miami FC ownership group, and the club would begin competition in the league beginning with the 2020 season.

Following the conclusion of the 2021 season, head coach and technical director Paul Dalglish left the team. On November 29, former Inter Miami CF assistant coach Anthony Pulis was named Miami FC's new head coach.

Sponsorship

Record

Year-by-year

Average attendance

Stadium

Players and staff

Current roster

Out on loan

Staff

Individual records

Top goalscorers

(Appearances listed in parenthesis next to total)

Most appearances

(Goals scored listed in parenthesis next to total)

Managerial records

Club culture

Miami FC draw the bulk of their support from the suburbs in the south and west of Miami.

The club's mascot is Golazo, a seven-foot-tall Kingfisher bird with blue and orange feathers.

Rivalries
The closest team geographically was the Fort Lauderdale Strikers with games between the two sides often labelled the FL Clásico. Fixtures with the other two teams in Florida, the Tampa Bay Rowdies and Jacksonville Armada are also keenly contested. These four teams competed for the Coastal Cup over the course of the 2016 season.

After the 2016 season Tampa Bay left the NASL for the United Soccer League and Fort Lauderdale ceased operations because of financial issues. That left Jacksonville as Miami FC's only in-state rival in the NASL. Miami did however face Tampa Bay in the third round of the 2017 U.S. Open Cup, defeating the Rowdies by a score of 2–0.

When the NASL cancelled the 2018 season, Miami and Jacksonville continued their rivalry in the NPSL in both 2018 and 2019 as both clubs continued operation. The team also began a rivalry against Miami United FC dubbed "Magic City Clasico." The teams met in the Second Round of the 2018 U.S. Open Cup where United shocked FC, 3–1, to advance.

Supporters group
Dade Brigade are the official supporters group of Miami FC and they occupy the east stand of FIU Stadium which is known as the Brigade End for home games. They are named for Miami-Dade County.

Honors

North American Soccer League
 Spring championship (1): 2017
 Fall championship (1): 2017

National Premier Soccer League
Sunshine Conference Championship (2): 2018, 2019
South Region Championship (2): 2018, 2019
National Championship (2): 2018, 2019

National Independent Soccer Association
East Coast Championship (1): 2019

Notes

References

External links

2018 Miami FC 2 (NPSL) Match Reports
2019 Miami FC (NPSL) Match Reports

 
2015 establishments in Florida
Association football clubs established in 2015
North American Soccer League teams
National Premier Soccer League teams
National Independent Soccer Association teams
USL Championship teams
Soccer clubs in Florida
Soccer clubs in Miami
Soccer clubs in South Florida